KDX (Korean Destroyer eXperimental) is a substantial shipbuilding program embarked on by the Republic of Korea Navy.

It is a three-phased program consisting of three individual classes of ships:
 KDX-I (3,800 tons),
 KDX-II (5,500 tons),
 Aegis-equipped KDX-III (11,000 tons).
 KDX-IIA, planned derivative of KDX-II with Aegis combat system (5,500 ~ 7,500 tons)

Gwanggaeto the Great class destroyer (KDX-I)

Chungmugong Yi Sun-shin class destroyer (KDX-II)

Sejong the Great class destroyer (KDX-III)

Destroyers of the Republic of Korea Navy